Muhamad Hafiy Haikal bin Ismail (born 24 April 1998) is a Malaysian professional footballer who plays as a defender for Malaysia Super League club Kelantan United.

Club career

Kelantan United
On 4 January 2023, Hafiy joined Malaysia Super League club Kelantan United. He made his Malaysia Super League debut for the club in a 0–1 loss against Selangor on 26 February 2023.

International career
On 15 August 2015, Hafiy received call up to the Malaysia U19s for a training camp for the 2015 AFF U-19 Youth Championship. He made 4 appearances during that tournament.

On 14 March 2018, Hafiy received call up to the Malaysia U21s for a training camp in Kelana Jaya.

Career statistics

Club

Honours

Johor Darul Ta'zim II

Malaysia Premier League: 2022
Malaysia Challenge Cup: 2019

References

External links
 

1998 births
Living people
Malaysian footballers
People from Kuala Lumpur
Johor Darul Ta'zim II F.C. players
Kelantan United F.C. players
Malaysia Super League players
Malaysian people of Malay descent
Association football defenders